Todor Todorov (born 9 May 1982) is a Bulgarian footballer who plays as a goalkeeper for Svetkavitsa Targovishte. He is known for his skill in saving penalties.

Awards

Litex
 Bulgarian A PFG - 2009/2010
 Bulgarian Cup - 2008, 2009
 UEFA Cup 2005-06: Group-stage

References

1982 births
Living people
Bulgarian footballers
PFC Cherno More Varna players
PFC Litex Lovech players
OFC Sliven 2000 players
PFC Lokomotiv Plovdiv players
PFC Svetkavitsa players
First Professional Football League (Bulgaria) players
Association football goalkeepers